Ćesim is a village in the municipalities of Konjic and Nevesinje, Bosnia and Herzegovina.

Demographics 
According to the 2013 census, its population was 5, all Serbs in the Nevesinje part.

References

Populated places in Konjic
Populated places in Nevesinje
Villages in Republika Srpska